Adásztevel is a village in Veszprém county, Hungary.

At the end of the 19th century and the beginning of the 20th century, Jews lived in the village. In 1840, 149 Jews lived in the village and there was a Jewish cemetery there. Some of them were murdered in the Holocaust.

Notable people 
 László Komár, Hungarian singer

References

External links
 Street map (Hungarian)

Populated places in Veszprém County
Jewish communities destroyed in the Holocaust